Éder Lima may refer to:

 Éder Lima (futsal player) (born 1984), Russian futsal player
 Éder Lima (footballer, born 1986), Brazilian football centre-back
 Éder Lima (footballer, born 1987), Brazilian football forward